The Grammy Award for Best Folk Album is an award presented at the Grammy Awards, a ceremony that was established in 1958 and originally called the Gramophone Awards, to recording artists for releasing albums in the folk genre. Honors in several categories are presented at the ceremony annually by the National Academy of Recording Arts and Sciences of the United States to "honor artistic achievement, technical proficiency and overall excellence in the recording industry, without regard to album sales or chart position".

According to the 54th Grammy Awards guideline the Best Folk Album category includes authentic folk material in both traditional vocal and instrumental styles, as well as contemporary material by artists who use traditional folk elements, sounds and instrumental techniques as the basis for their recordings. Folk music is primarily but not exclusively acoustic, often using contemporary arrangements with production and sensibilities distinctly different from a pop approach.

This award combines the previous categories for Best Contemporary Folk Album and Traditional Folk Album. The Recording Academy decided to create this new category for 2012 upon stating there were "challenges in distinguishing between... Contemporary and Traditional Folk".

Recipients 

 Each year is linked to the article about the Grammy Awards held that year.

Artists with multiple wins
2 wins
 Chris Thile (one as a member of the Punch Brothers)

Artists with multiple nominations
4 nominations
 Rhiannon Giddens (one as a member The Carolina Chocolate Drops)
3 nominations
 Sarah Jarosz
 Chris Thile (one as a member of the Punch Brothers)
2 nominations
 Judy Collins 
 Madison Cunningham
 Dom Flemons (one as a member of The Carolina Chocolate Drops)
 Patty Griffin
 Laura Marling
 Punch Brothers
 Gillian Welch
 Joy Williams (one as a member of The Civil Wars)

See also
List of Grammy Award categories

References

External links 
 Official Site of the Grammy Awards

Grammy Awards for folk music
Folk Album
Album awards